Fitzenhagen is a German language surname.

List of people with the surname 

 Heather Fitzenhagen (born 1960), American politician
 Wilhelm Fitzenhagen (1848–1890), German musician

See also 

 Fitz
 Hagen (surname)
 String Quartet (Fitzenhagen)

Surnames
Surnames of German origin
German-language surnames